John of Tobolsk (1651–1715) was born as Ioann Maksimovich Vasilkovskiy in Nieżyn, in the Czernihow Voivodeship of the Polish–Lithuanian Commonwealth. He was the only one of the seven sons of Maksym Wasylkowski Maksymowicz to enter the service of the Eastern Orthodox Church, in which he was appointed manager of the Kiev Pechersk Lavra by 1678. As Bishop Theodore of Uglich wanted someone to succeed him of Chernigov, he appointed John as Archimandrite of the Eletsky Monastery in 1695.  Bishop Theodore of Uglich reposed in 1696 and John became Archbishop of Chernigov.

During his pastorate in Chernigov, John distinguished himself by operating a spiritual academy, writing prose and poetry inspired by faith, and inspiring faith in others. His most famous work is "Iliotropion", which he wrote in Latin, translated into Slavonic and then into Russian. In the early 21st century, it remains the standard work on theodicy among the Eastern Orthodox.

In 1711, he was made Metropolitan of the Siberian city of Tobolsk, taking the place of Metropolitan Philotheos who wished to carry out missionary work among pagan tribes in remote places.

John reposed peacefully in 1715, inside his quarters while at prayer. John was honoured as a saint in Siberia by longstanding local veneration. In 1916 the Russian Orthodox Church officially glorified (canonized) him for veneration throughout the church. His feast day is June 10, the anniversary of his repose.

John of Tobolsk is the namesake of John of Shanghai and San Francisco.

References

External links
Iliotropion by St. John 
St John Maximovitch the Metropolitan of Tobolsk Orthodox icon and synaxarion 

1651 births
1715 deaths
National University of Kyiv-Mohyla Academy alumni
Bishops of Chernihiv
People from Nizhyn
People from Czernihow Voivodeship
Russian saints of the Eastern Orthodox Church
Eastern Orthodox saints from Ukraine
Ukrainian Orthodox bishops
Russian Orthodox Christians from Ukraine
Ukrainian people of Serbian descent